Rauni is a name for a being in Finnish mythology. The exact role and identity of Rauni is debated, and theories range from Rauni having been a mother goddess and consort of Ukko to being identified with Ukko himself.

Interpretations
Opinion among scholars concerning the role of Rauni in Finnish mythology is varied. Some interpret Rauni as a name for the consort of Ukko, the Finnish god of thunder. Some also identify Rauni with the rowan tree, citing the reconstructed Old Norse form *raunir (English: rowan) as linguistic evidence. Others still, among them Martti Haavio, contend that Rauni is simply an epithet for a deity called Ukko, who may or may not be the well-known Finnish thunder god, and that the other theories are based on a misreading of a poem documenting Finnish pre-Christian beliefs by Mikael Agricola.

See also
 Akka
 Ukko

References
 Haavio, Martti: Karjalan jumalat. Porvoo: WSOY, 1959.

Finnish mythology
Finnish goddesses
Finnish gods
Nature deities
Mother goddesses